The Ramsgate-class motor lifeboat was a special design produced by the RNLI for three stations covering the Thames estuary and required to operate in shallow waters.

History
The other two were  longer and twin engined. All three had long careers at their respective stations but when they were replaced between 1953 and 1955, it was with standard 46ft 9in Watson boats.

Description
The first Ramsgate was an open design with no cockpits and low end boxes. Powered by a single 80 bhp Weyburn built DE6 6-cylinder petrol engine driving a single screw, the boat retained an auxiliary sailing rig as well as six oars. The other two boats were substantially redesigned, being  longer and powered by two 40 bhp Weyburn built CE4 4-cylinder petrol engines driving twin screws. The sailing rig was much reduced and the boats had a shelter ahead of the cockpit covering the engine controls. Just ahead of this was a funnel for engine exhaust.

Fleet

External links
RNLI

Royal National Lifeboat Institution lifeboats